George Warren (1880 – 16 May 1917) was an English professional footballer who played in the Football League for Leicester Fosse, Burton Swifts and Stockport County as a forward. He also played in the Southern League for Coventry City and was nicknamed "Tubby". He was described as "a great centre-forward" who possessed "an invaluable capacity for keeping
opposing defences guessing".

Personal life 
As of 1901, Warren was working as a plumber in Hinckley. He married in 1903 and had two children before his wife died in 1915. At the outbreak of the First World War in 1914, Warren was the licensed victualler of the Three Tuns Inn, Hinckley. In December 1915, 18 months after the outbreak of the war, he enlisted in the Army Reserve and remarried in 1916 and had another child. In April 1917, Warren was posted to the Western Front as a private in the Army Service Corps and was killed just one month later in the Loos Salient, while serving with the York and Lancaster Regiment. He was buried in Philosophe British Cemetery, Mazingarbe.

Career statistics

Honours 
Nuneaton Town
 Atherstone Nursing Cup: 1912–13

References

1880 births
1917 deaths
Military personnel from Staffordshire
Burials in Hauts-de-France
Sportspeople from Burton upon Trent
English footballers
Association football inside forwards
Burton Swifts F.C. players
Sheppey United F.C. players
Hinckley Town F.C. players
Leicester City F.C. players
Gresley F.C. players
Hinckley Athletic F.C. players
Nuneaton Borough F.C. players
Coventry City F.C. players
Willenhall F.C. players
Stockport County F.C. players
Dudley Town F.C. players
Southern Football League players
Midland Football League players
English Football League players
British Army personnel of World War I
York and Lancaster Regiment soldiers
British military personnel killed in World War I
British plumbers
British builders
Royal Army Service Corps soldiers